Chuang Chin-sheng (born 13 July 1941) is a Taiwanese politician.

Chuang studied law at National Chung Hsing University and was a high school teacher prior to his career in politics.

Chuang was mayor of Guangfu, Hualien before serving two terms (1981–1989) on the Taiwan Provincial Assembly. He won his first election to the Legislative Yuan in 1990, as a member of the Kuomintang from the Lowland Aborigine Constituency. Chuang was a member of the Legislative Yuan until 1999.

References

1941 births
Living people
Amis people
Aboriginal Members of the Legislative Yuan
Members of the 1st Legislative Yuan in Taiwan
Members of the 2nd Legislative Yuan
Members of the 3rd Legislative Yuan
Mayors of places in Taiwan
Taiwanese schoolteachers
National Chung Hsing University alumni
20th-century Taiwanese educators